Mandor is an ILRC and village in Phagi Tehsil in Jaipur district, Rajasthan.

Mandor has seven patwar circles - Kansel, Pachala, Mandor, Rotwara, Ladana, Sawai Jaisinghpura and Sultaniya.

Based on 2011 census, Mandor has 158 households with total population of 1,191 (51.89% males, 48.11% females). The total area of the village is 11.55 km2.  There is one primary school in the village.

Villages in Mandor

References

Villages in Jaipur district